The Former Residence of Ding Richang was built in 1878, during the late Qing dynasty (1644–1911). It was the mansion of Ding Richang, a senior official in the Qing court.

History
The former residence was built in memory of Ding Xianba, the father of Ding Richang, in 1878 after his retirement. Ding died there on 27 February 1882.

It was designated as a municipal level cultural heritage in 1993 and then a provincial level cultural preservation unit in 2008.

In March 2013, it was listed among the seventh group of "Major National Historical and Cultural Sites in Guangdong" by the State Council of China.

Architecture

Gallery

References

Major National Historical and Cultural Sites in Guangdong
Traditional folk houses in Guangdong
Buildings and structures in Jieyang
Tourist attractions in Jieyang
Qing dynasty architecture
1878 establishments in China